Frank Kalanda is a Ugandan footballer.

External links 
 

Living people
Association football forwards
Ugandan footballers
Uganda international footballers
Year of birth missing (living people)
Uganda A' international footballers
2016 African Nations Championship players